Llanharan railway station serves the village of Llanharan in south Wales. Funded in part by SEWTA and at a cost of £4.3 million, it opened in December 2007.

History
A former station was on the site until 1964, when it was closed under the Beeching Cuts. Following local campaigning from residents with backing from the MP and AM. EC funding was secured and a new station was agreed and work began in 2007.

Facilities
The station has two platforms connected by a footbridge and small shelters for passengers. It is unmanned but features CCTV and help points. A car park is next to the station.

The approved design features Corus Modular Platforms. The Modular Platform was selected as the majority of the structure can be erected with trains still running. Alternative forms of construction would have required extended blockage of the line (with associated disruption to through services on the South Wales Main Line).

The principal contractor for construction was Galliford Try Water & Rail, utilising local subcontractors where possible.

Services 
These services are operated mainly by Class 170 Turbostar units.

On Sundays the service decreases slightly.

References

External links

Railway stations in Rhondda Cynon Taf
DfT Category F2 stations
Former Great Western Railway stations
Railway stations in Great Britain opened in 1850
Railway stations in Great Britain closed in 1964
Railway stations in Great Britain opened in 2007
Reopened railway stations in Great Britain
South Wales Main Line
Railway stations served by Transport for Wales Rail
Beeching closures in Wales